The 1982 Cal State Hayward Pioneers football team represented California State University, Hayward—now known as California State University, East Bay—as a member of the Northern California Athletic Conference (NCAC) during the 1982 NCAA Division II football season. Led by eighth-year head coach Tim Tierney, Cal State Hayward compiled an overall record of 4–5–1 with a mark of 3–2 in conference play, tying for second place in the NCAC. The team outscored its opponents 240 to 236 for the season. The Pioneers played home games at Pioneer Stadium in Hayward, California.

Schedule

Team players in the NFL
No Cal State Hayward Pioneers players were selected in the 1983 NFL Draft.

The following finished their college career in 1982, were not drafted, but played in the NFL.

References

Cal State Hayward
Cal State Hayward Pioneers football seasons
Cal State Hayward Pioneers football